Victor Da Silva (born 21 April 1962) is a Portuguese former professional footballer who played as a midfielder. He played his entire career in France, where he made 119 appearances and scored one goal in the Division 1. In addition to Portuguese citizenship, he holds French citizenship.

Honours 
Monaco

 Coupe de France runner-up: 1983–84

References 

1962 births
Living people
Footballers from Porto
Portuguese footballers
French footballers
Naturalized citizens of France
Association football midfielders
INF Vichy players
AS Monaco FC players
Olympique Alès players
Lille OSC players
La Roche VF players
Tours FC players
French Division 3 (1971–1993) players
Ligue 1 players
Ligue 2 players
Championnat National 2 players
Portuguese expatriate footballers
Expatriate footballers in Monaco
Portuguese expatriate sportspeople in Monaco

French people of Portuguese descent